The 2023 Canadian Mixed Doubles Curling Championship was held from March 21 to 26 at the Gerry McCrory Countryside Sports Complex in Sudbury, Ontario. The winning pair will represent Canada at the 2023 World Mixed Doubles Curling Championship in Gangneung, South Korea. This is the first time the event will be held since 2021 when it was hosted in the "bubble" and the first time since 2019 it will be held with fans.

Teams
The teams are listed as follows:

Provincial and territorial champions

Canadian Mixed Doubles Ranking qualifiers

Round robin standings

Round robin results
All draws are listed in Eastern Time (UTC−04:00).

Draw 1
Tuesday, March 21, 6:00 pm

Draw 2
Tuesday, March 21, 9:00 pm

Draw 3
Wednesday, March 22, 10:00 am

Draw 4
Wednesday, March 22, 1:00 pm

Draw 5
Wednesday, March 22, 4:00 pm

Draw 6
Wednesday, March 22, 7:00 pm

Draw 7
Thursday, March 23, 10:00 am

Draw 8
Thursday, March 23, 1:00 pm

Draw 9
Thursday, March 23, 4:00 pm

Draw 10
Thursday, March 23, 7:00 pm

Draw 11
Friday, March 24, 10:00 am

Draw 12
Friday, March 24, 1:00 pm

Draw 13
Friday, March 24, 4:00 pm

Draw 14
Friday, March 24, 7:00 pm

Playoffs

Qualification games
Saturday, March 25, 3:00 pm

Quarterfinals
Saturday, March 25, 7:00 pm

Semifinals
Sunday, March 26, 9:30 am

Final
Sunday, March 26, 1:00 pm

Final standings

Notes

References

External links

Canadian Mixed Doubles Curling Championship
Curling competitions in Greater Sudbury
March 2023 sports events in Canada
Canadian Mixed Doubles Curling Championship
Canadian Mixed Doubles Curling Championship